Federal Investigative Services (FIS) was a U.S. Government agency within the United States Office of Personnel Management responsible for performing security clearance investigations. In January 2016 the Obama administration announced that the agency would be replaced with the new National Background Investigations Bureau following a series of intelligence failures and investigations conducted into USIS (company) for contract fraud.

See also
USIS
Department of the Navy Central Adjudication Facility
Edward Snowden
Blake Percival

References

Classified information in the United States
United States Office of Personnel Management